J-CODE, an acronym for Joint Criminal Opioid Darknet Enforcement, is an FBI operation announced by U.S. Attorney General Jeff Sessions on January 29, 2018, in Pittsburgh, Pennsylvania which targets illegal opioid distribution on the Darknet. Given the integrity and robustness of the hidden services of the Tor anonymity network, however, sting operations, the seizure of servers, the tracking of postal deliveries, and in general the exploitation of failures of operational security  are expected to be standard operating procedure.

References

Federal Bureau of Investigation operations
Opioids
Tor (anonymity network)
Task forces